Elite Police Training School, Bedian Road, Lahore, Pakistan is a police training school for the Punjab Elite Police located on Bedian Road in Lahore.

On 15 October 2009, the training institute was attacked by four terrorists using guns and grenades. Two policemen were killed, including Jafar Hussain, an Assistant Sub-Inspector who led the fight against them; all the terrorists were killed.

References

External links

Buildings and structures in Lahore
Punjab Police (Pakistan)
Police academies in Pakistan